Iván Rodrigo Silva Olivera (born October 23, 1993) is a Uruguayan footballer who plays for Ecuadorian side Club Atlético Porteño on loan from Uruguayan Primera División club River Plate.

Career
Silva began his career in 2011 with Tacuarembó FC, where he played for four seasons. Since April 2015 he plays for River Plate as a central defender.

References

1993 births
Living people
Uruguayan footballers
Uruguayan expatriate footballers
Association football defenders
Uruguayan Primera División players
Club Atlético River Plate (Montevideo) players
Tacuarembó F.C. players
Uruguayan expatriate sportspeople in Ecuador
Expatriate footballers in Ecuador